Seán Gleeson (born 18 February) is an English actor, director and producer, known for his roles as Conor Flaherty in the BBC soap opera EastEnders and Ronnie Woodson in the BBC soap opera Doctors. As well as acting, Gleeson also works as a director and producer, with credits on Doctors, Casualty and Holby City.

Life and career
In 1997, Gleeson began portraying the role of Conor Flaherty in the BBC soap opera EastEnders. He stayed in the role until 1999, and in 2003, he joined the cast of the BBC soap opera Doctors as Ronnie Woodson. While on Doctors, he began a relationship with co-star Stirling Gallacher, who portrayed the role of George Woodson, his on-screen wife. The pair won the British Soap Award for Best On-Screen Partnership in 2007. Gleeson lives in Gloucestershire with Gallacher, and the pair got married in 2009, also having a son in the same year.

Whilst appearing on Doctors, Gleeson directed several episodes. After making the decision to stop portraying the role of Ronnie in 2009, he continued to direct episodes of Doctors until 2013. He then began directing episodes of the BBC medical drama Casualty, and later became a producer of the series in 2020. In March 2021, he was named as the new series producer of Casualtys sister series Holby City. On the role, he commented: "This is obviously an exciting opportunity. I'm really looking forward to getting stuck in and working with the crews, cast and whole Holby family on consolidating and reinvigorating this firm favourite for an even wider audience."

Filmography

As actor

As crew member

Awards and nominations

References

External links
 

English male film actors
English male soap opera actors
English people of Irish descent
English television directors
English television producers
Living people
Male actors from Gloucestershire
Male actors from London
Year of birth missing (living people)